Beggs is a city in Okmulgee County, Oklahoma, United States. The population was 1,321 at the 2010 census. Beggs was named for C.H. Beggs, vice president of the St. Louis-San Francisco (Frisco) Railway.

History
Starting as a Frisco railroad stop in 1899, Beggs officially became a town on September 15, 1900, when its post office opened. It originally was a center for hog, cattle, and horse ranches in the area. In 1918, oil was discovered just to the west, and Beggs became an oil boomtown until circa 1926. After that, corn, cotton, pecans, and stock raising became important local industries, but Beggs went into a gradual decline, going from an official population of 2,327 in 1920 to 1,531 in 1930 and 1,107 in 1970. The population has since shown some upward fluctuation, settling at 1,321 as of the 2010 census.

Isparhecher House and Grave is among the National Register of Historic Places listings in Okmulgee County, Oklahoma, and is located approximately four miles west of town off State Highway 16 on private land.

Despite its size, Beggs has at least seven churches.

Geography
Beggs is located at  (35.755595, −96.038052). That puts Beggs approximately 30 miles south of downtown Tulsa and four miles west of U.S. Route 75, a major national north–south artery. U.S. Route 75 Alternate, the only such bannered route stemming from U.S. Route 75, is largely along the former alignment of the old Highway 75 prior to 1959, and travels from U.S. 75 west to Beggs, along SH-16, before turning north along said former alignment and continuing to Sapulpa. The former alignment running directly south from Beggs to Okmulgee is known as Old Highway 75. The major east–west route through Beggs is Oklahoma State Highway 16.

Demographics

As of the census of 2000, there were 1,364 people, 538 households, and 363 families residing in the city. The population density was 320.3 people per square mile (123.6/km2). There were 608 housing units at an average density of 142.8 per square mile (55.1/km2). The racial makeup of the city was 59.53% White, 21.70% African American, 9.75% Native American, 0.15% from other races, and 8.87% from two or more races. Hispanic or Latino of any race were 1.25% of the population.

There were 538 households, out of which 33.5% had children under the age of 18 living with them, 47.2% were married couples living together, 17.1% had a female householder with no husband present, and 32.5% were non-families. 30.7% of all households were made up of individuals, and 15.2% had someone living alone who was 65 years of age or older. The average household size was 2.51 and the average family size was 3.13.

In the city, the population was spread out, with 28.8% under the age of 18, 9.3% from 18 to 24, 26.5% from 25 to 44, 22.1% from 45 to 64, and 13.3% who were 65 years of age or older. The median age was 35 years. For every 100 females, there were 89.4 males. For every 100 females age 18 and over, there were 82.5 males.

The median income for a household in the city was $25,063, and the median income for a family was $31,250. Males had a median income of $26,150 versus $22,143 for females. The per capita income for the city was $12,191. About 16.9% of families and 18.4% of the population were below the poverty line, including 20.1% of those under age 18 and 29.3% of those age 65 or over.

Recreation
Recreational opportunities include Old Beggs Lake, southeast of the town center, and the larger New Beggs Lake, almost directly east of the town center.

A city playground on Main Street was revitalized as Legacy Park in the 2019–2020 timeframe, complete with playground equipment, a pavilion, and picnic tables.

Beggs Fairgrounds and Round-Up Club Arena is a fairgrounds and rodeo arena, available for special events.

Notable people
 Lloyd Edgar Acree, posthumous recipient of the Navy Cross, was born here in 1920.
 Suzan Shown Harjo, advocate for Native Americans
 Don Owen, Louisiana broadcast journalist and politician was born in Beggs in 1930.
 Dan Rowan, best known for playing the straight man to Dick Martin on Rowan & Martin's Laugh-In.
 Alvin "Pooh" Williamson (born September 5, 1973) is a former college basketball player who is currently an assistant coach at the University of Miami.
 Rodney Tate (born February 14, 1959) – NFL RB 1982–1984 for Cincinnati Bengals and Atlanta Falcons. (http://www.nfl.com/player/rodneytate/2527042/careerstats)  He played college Football for University of Texas and was part of the Beggs State Championship team in 1975.
 Joe Martel III First know amputee to play football in Oklahoma and Social media influencer. 
 Cpl. Sammie Hubbell, Purple Heart recipient and Gold Star soldier as a member of Company A, 1st BN, 32nd Infantry Reg'mnt., 7th Infantry when American and U.N. forces were overrun by Chinese Communist Forces (CCF) at the Battle of Chosin Reservoir in North Korea.

In popular culture
Beggs attracted national attention in the late 1970s when public pay phones offering calls for only five cents had long since been phased out across the country, but Beggs still had them. In the 21st century, pay phones of any cost began to be phased out across the country by AT&T in 2007 and Verizon in 2011. But as of mid-2022, Beggs still has nickel public pay phones, maintained by the Beggs Telephone Company.

Beggs features prominently in The Great War: American Front, the second volume of the Southern Victory alternate history novels by author Harry Turtledove. In it, Confederate forces, having won the War of Secession in 1862, are pitted against Union forces in 1914-era trench combat on the North American continent, including in the Confederate state of Sequoyah (Oklahoma) around the town of Beggs.

Beggs was one of the filming sites for principal photography on Season One of the FX comedy series Reservation Dogs from filmmaker Sterlin Harjo, which concerns four Native American teens in rural Oklahoma.

Notes

References

External links
 Encyclopedia of Oklahoma History and Culture – Beggs
 Beggs Chamber of Commerce (archived)
 Beggs Area Chamber of Commerce (Facebook)

Cities in Okmulgee County, Oklahoma
Cities in Oklahoma
Tulsa metropolitan area
1899 establishments in Indian Territory